I Rock is an Australian comedy / drama television series which first screened on ABC2 from 3 May 2010.

The series revolves around Nash Taylor and his struggling indie rock band, Boy Crazy Stacey, trying to make it big on the Australian music scene. The series was shot in the pub scene of the inner west suburbs of Sydney. Guest stars include Tim Rogers from Sydney band You Am I, Cassette Kids and radio broadcaster personality Scott Dooley.

The series stars Josh Mapleston. It was written by Josh Mapleston with David Fedirchuk and Rob Macdonald, produced by David Fedirchuk & Rob Macdonald and directed by Rob Macdonald.

Cast
 Josh Mapleston as Nash Taylor
 Mark Pound as Jasper Taylor
 Ashley Fitzgerald as Comet
 Jeremy Keast as Luke
 Alison Bell as Jane
 Pat Ommundson as Val
 Kate Sherman as Cara
 Dani Swan as Sasha & Choreographer

Guests
 Tim Rogers
 Laura Imbruglia
 Cassette Kids
 Snob Scrilla
 The Lovetones
 Scott Dooley
 Maz Compton
 Rob Carlton
 Jason Whalley from Frenzal Rhomb

DVD release
I Rock season 1 can now be purchased on DVD as of 1 July 2010.

Episodes

Season 1 (2010)

International broadcasters

See also
 List of Australian television series
 List of Australian Broadcasting Corporation programs

References

External links

Official Website
Buy I Rock on DVD
Production Company Website
I Rock on I View
Triple J Unearthed Profile

2010 Australian television series debuts
2010 Australian television series endings
Australian comedy television series
Australian Broadcasting Corporation original programming
Television shows set in New South Wales